XTM may refer to:
 XML Topic Maps (IT)
 X-Ray Tomographic Methods (Medicine), imaging by sections 
 XTM (band), Catalan dance music band consisting of brothers Xasqui and Toni Ten
 XTM (TV Channel), South Korean TV channel